Michael Jefferson Wallrich (March 25, 1857 – March 2, 1941) was a member of the Wisconsin State Assembly.

Biography
Wallrich was born on March 25, 1857, in Brighton, Kenosha County, Wisconsin. He attended the University of Wisconsin-Madison and the University of Wisconsin Law School. He died on March 2, 1941.

Career
Wallrich was elected to the Assembly in 1902. Additionally, he served as City Attorney of Shawano, Wisconsin, District Attorney of Shawano County, Wisconsin, Chairman of the Shawano County Republican Committee, a member of the Shawano County Board and Mayor of Shawano. He was also a delegate to the Republican State Convention of Wisconsin in 1886, 1888, 1890 1892, 1894, 1896, 1900 and 1902.

References

External links

People from Brighton, Kenosha County, Wisconsin
People from Shawano, Wisconsin
Republican Party members of the Wisconsin State Assembly
Mayors of places in Wisconsin
County supervisors in Wisconsin
District attorneys in Wisconsin
University of Wisconsin–Madison alumni
University of Wisconsin Law School alumni
1857 births
1941 deaths